Ander Murillo García (born 22 July 1983) is a Spanish former footballer who played as a defender.

He spent most of his professional career with Athletic Bilbao and AEK Larnaca, appearing in 157 competitive matches with the former over nine seasons and 184 for the latter in seven.

Club career

Athletic Bilbao
Murillo was born in San Sebastián, Gipuzkoa. A product of Athletic Bilbao's prolific youth system, he made his debut for their first team on 24 November 2001, in a 2–1 away win against FC Barcelona; he played a further 18 La Liga games the following season, after breaking his leg during preseason.

From 2004 to 2007, Murillo would be an important defensive element for the Lions, being deployed as a right-back or in the middle, but he suffered greatly with injuries subsequently. On 21 December 2008, after nearly a year without competitive appearances, he started in the 1–0 away victory over Real Betis only to leave the pitch before half-time injured.

On 11 August 2009, after only two matches during the 2008–09 campaign, Murillo moved to Segunda División side UD Salamanca in a season-long move. In late August 2010 he terminated his Athletic contract and left the club after 11 years, signing with RC Celta de Vigo also of the second tier.

AEK Larnaca
Having joined in the summer of 2011 at the age of 28, Murillo went on to play several years with AEK Larnaca FC in the Cypriot First Division, as part of a large contingent of Spanish players and managers at the side. He helped the club finish second in the league table for three consecutive seasons between 2015 and 2017, their highest-ever placings; his final professional match was the 2018 Cypriot Cup final which was won 2–1 against Apollon Limassol FC (the scorer of the winning goal being another Spanish veteran, Acorán), to collect their first silverware since lifting the same trophy in 2004.

In June 2018, Murillo retired and was named AEK's director of football as longtime Athletic Bilbao teammate Andoni Iraola signed as manager.

Personal life
Murillo's father Luciano and his uncle Eliseo were also footballers and defenders who played for Real Sociedad, having moved to San Sebastián at a young age from Extremadura.

Career statistics

Honours
AEK Larnaca
Cypriot Cup: 2017–18

Spain U19
UEFA European Under-19 Championship: 2002

References

External links

1983 births
Living people
Spanish footballers
Footballers from San Sebastián
Association football defenders
La Liga players
Segunda División players
Segunda División B players
Antiguoko players
Bilbao Athletic footballers
Athletic Bilbao footballers
UD Salamanca players
RC Celta de Vigo players
Cypriot First Division players
AEK Larnaca FC players
Spain youth international footballers
Spain under-21 international footballers
Basque Country international footballers
Spanish expatriate footballers
Expatriate footballers in Cyprus
Spanish expatriate sportspeople in Cyprus